Jean Coutu may refer to:

 Jean Coutu (actor), actor from Quebec, Canada
 Jean Coutu (pharmacist), Quebec pharmacist
 Jean Coutu Group, Quebec business

See also 

 Coutu (disambiguation)